Balkan sworn virgins are women who take a vow of chastity and live as men in patriarchal northern Albanian society, Kosovo and Montenegro. To a lesser extent, the practice exists, or has existed, in other parts of the western Balkans, including Bosnia, Dalmatia (Croatia), Serbia and North Macedonia.

In times when women had a prescribed role, burrnesha gave up their sexual, reproductive and social identities to acquire the same freedoms as men. They could dress as men, be head of the household, move freely in social situations, and take work traditionally open only to men. National Geographic's Taboo estimated in 2002 that there were fewer than 102 Albanian sworn virgins left. , while there were no exact figures, twelve burrnesha were estimated to remain in Northern Albania and Kosovo.

Terminology

Origins 
The tradition of sworn virgins in Albania developed out of the Kanuni i Lekë Dukagjinit (or simply the Kanun), a set of codes and laws developed by Lekë Dukagjini and used mostly in northern Albania and Kosovo from the 15th century until the 20th century. The Kanun is not a religious document – many groups follow it, including Albanian Orthodox, Catholics and Muslims.

The Kanun dictates that families must be patrilineal (meaning wealth is inherited through a family's men) and patrilocal (upon marriage, a woman moves into the household of her husband's family). Women are treated like property of the family. Under the Kanun, women are stripped of many rights. They cannot smoke, wear a watch, or vote in local elections. They cannot buy land, and there are many jobs they are not permitted to hold. There are also establishments that they cannot enter.

The practice of sworn virginhood was first reported by missionaries, travelers, geographers and anthropologists, who visited the mountains of northern Albania in the 19th and early 20th centuries. One of them was Edith Durham, who took the accompanying photograph.

Overview 
A person can become a sworn virgin at any age, out of personal desire or to satisfy parents. One becomes a sworn virgin by swearing an irrevocable oath, in front of twelve village or tribal elders, to adopt the role and practice celibacy. After this, sworn virgins live as men and others relate to them as such, usually though not always using masculine pronouns to address them or speak about them to other people.  They may dress in male clothing, use a male name, carry a gun, smoke, drink alcohol, take on male work, act as the head of a household (for example, living with a sister or mother), play music, sing, and sit and talk socially with men.

According to Marina Warner, the sworn virgin's "true sex will never again, on pain of death, be alluded to either in her presence or out of it." Similar practices occurred in some societies of indigenous peoples of the Americas.

Breaking the vow was once punishable by death, but it is doubtful that this punishment is still carried out. Many sworn virgins today still refuse to go back on their oath because their community would reject them for breaking the vows. However, it is sometimes possible to take back the vows if the reasons or motivations or obligations to family which led to taking the vow no longer exist.

Motivations 
There are many reasons why someone might take this vow, and observers recorded a variety of motivations. One person spoke of becoming a sworn virgin in order to not be separated from his father, and another in order to live and work with a sister. Some hoped to avoid a specific unwanted marriage, and others hoped to avoid marriage in general; becoming a sworn virgin was also the only way for families who had committed children to an arranged marriage to refuse to fulfil it, without dishonouring the groom's family and risking a blood feud.

It was the only way a woman could inherit her family's wealth, which was particularly important in a society in which blood feuds (gjakmarrja) resulted in the deaths of many male Albanians, leaving many families without male heirs. (However, anthropologist Jeffrey Dickemann suggests this motive may be "over-pat", pointing out that a non-child-bearing woman would have no heirs to inherit after her, and also that in some families not one but several daughters became sworn virgins, and in others the later birth of a brother did not end the sworn virgin's masculine role.) Moreover, a child may have been desired to "carry on" an existing feud, according to Marina Warner. The sworn virgin became "a warrior in disguise to defend her family like a man." If a sworn virgin was killed in a blood feud, the death counted as a full life for the purposes of calculating blood money, rather than the half-life a woman was counted as.

It is also likely that many women chose to become sworn virgins simply because it afforded them much more freedom than would otherwise have been available in a patrilineal culture in which women were secluded, sex-segregated, required to be virgins before marriage and faithful afterwards, betrothed as children and married by sale without their consent, continually bearing and raising children, constantly physically labouring, and always required to defer to men, particularly their husbands and fathers, and submit to being beaten.

Dickemann suggests mothers may have played an important role in persuading children to become sworn virgins. A widow without sons traditionally had few options in Albania: she could return to her birth family, stay on as a servant in the family of her deceased husband, or remarry. With a son or surrogate son, she could live out her life in the home of her adulthood, in the company of her child. Murray quotes testimony recorded by René Gremaux: "Because if you get married I'll be left alone, but if you stay with me, I'll have a son." On hearing those words Djurdja [the daughter] "threw down her embroidery" and became a man.

Prevalence 
The practice has died out in Dalmatia and Bosnia, but is still carried out in northern Albania and to a lesser extent in North Macedonia.

The Socialist People's Republic of Albania did not encourage people to become sworn virgins. Women started gaining legal rights and came closer to having equal social status, especially in the central and southern regions. It is only in the northern region that many families are still traditionally patriarchal. In 2008 there were between forty and several hundred sworn virgins left in Albania, and a few in neighboring countries, most over fifty years old, with an estimated twelve left in 2022. It used to be believed that the sworn virgins had all but died out after 50 years of communism in Albania, but recent research suggests that may not be the case; instead, the increase in feuding following the collapse of the communist regime could encourage a resurgence of the practice.

In 2022 the niece of a burrnesha said that "Today we girls don't have to fight to become men. We have to fight for equal rights, but not by becoming men." She herself left the remote settlement where she and her aunt lived for Tirana, where women "have more advantages and are more emancipated".

In popular culture 
Virdžina (1991), a Yugoslav drama film based on this old custom, directed by Srđan Karanović.
In "The Albanian Virgin" (1994), a short story by Alice Munro first published in The New Yorker, a Canadian woman being held hostage by Albanians takes the vow to avoid forced marriage. (For information about documented kidnappings, see Ion Perdicaris and the Miss Stone Affair.)
Italian director Laura Bispuri's first feature film, Sworn Virgin (2015), depicts the life of Hana, played by Italian actress Alba Rohrwacher. The film is based on the novel of the same name by Albanian writer Elvira Dones. There are centuries-old Albanian communities in Italy.
Written by an American writer with no Albanian background, Kristopher Dukes's first novel, The Sworn Virgin (2017), follows an untraditional young woman in the mountains of 1910, as her father is gunned down due to an old blood feud, and she takes the vow to avoid an arranged marriage.

Noted sworn virgins
 Stana Cerović
 Mikaš Karadžić
 Tone Bikaj
 Durdjan Ibi Glavola
 Stanica-Daga Marinković

See also
 Samsui women, a similar practice among Chinese diaspora women in Southeast Asia
 Bacha posh, a similar practice in Afghanistan and Pakistan
 Vestal Virgin
 Honorary male

Notes

References

Further reading
Grémaux, René. "Woman Becomes Man in the Balkans", in Gilbert Herdt, ed. 1996: Third Sex Third Gender: Beyond Sexual Dimorphism in Culture and History. 

Munro, Alice (1994), "The Albanian Virgin," a piece of short fiction in the collection Open Secrets.  
Dukes, Kristopher (2017), "The Sworn Virgin," a historical fiction novel about the tradition.  
Young, Antonia (2000). Women Who Become Men: Albanian Sworn Virgins.

External links 
 Albanian Custom Fades: Woman as Family Man by Dan Bilefsky, 2008
 Photographs by Jill Peters, 2012
 Photographs by Johan Spanner, The New York Times, 2008
 Photographs by Pepa Hristova, German Society for Photography, 2009
 BBC radio show on sworn virgins
 Sworn Virgins – National Geographic Film (approx. 4 min.)
 BBC From Our Own Correspondent 02/09

Albanian culture
Cross-dressing
Gender in Albania
Gender systems
Men in Albania
Non-sexuality
Sexism
Sexual abstinence
Third gender
Women in Albania
Women's rights in Europe
History of women in Albania
History of women in North Macedonia